Chris Garner (born April 7, 1969) is an American former tennis player.

Born in Bellefonte, Pennsylvania, Garner was the number one junior tennis player in multiple age categories, winning the U.S. National 16 and under Championship in 1984. Garner played one year of college tennis where he was an All-American at the University of Georgia before turning professional in 1988. Although he did not win any titles (singles and/or doubles) during his professional career, he scored wins over world #1 players Andre Agassi, Yevgeny Kafelnikov and Pat Rafter. Garner, a right-hander, reached his highest individual ranking on the ATP Tour on August 26, 1991, when he became the world No. 120.

While on tour, Garner resided in Bay Shore, New York.

Garner currently is the head coach of the U.S. Naval Academy men's tennis team. Previously, he was head coach at Amherst College.

References

External links
 
 

1969 births
Living people
People from Bellefonte, Pennsylvania
American male tennis players
Georgia Bulldogs tennis players
People from Bay Shore, New York
Tennis people from New York (state)
Tennis people from Pennsylvania
Navy Midshipmen men's tennis coaches
American tennis coaches